Graham Levy (born 10 February 1938) is an Australian cricketer. He played in one first-class match for South Australia in 1961/62.

See also
 List of South Australian representative cricketers

References

External links
 

1938 births
Living people
Australian cricketers
South Australia cricketers
Cricketers from Adelaide